After the Promise is a 1987 American drama television film directed by David Greene and written by Robert W. Lenski from a story by Sebastian Milito. Inspired by actual events, the film stars Mark Harmon, Diana Scarwid, Rosemary Dunsmore and Donnelly Rhodes. It aired on CBS on October 11, 1987, and received positive reviews.

Plot
Elmer Jackson is a carpenter in a small Californian town in the 1930s. Struggling to bring up four young boys after the death of his wife, he is horrified when the government (citing trumped-up charges of parental neglect) places the boys into various foster homes and institutions, unaware of the abuse that boys would then be subjected to. The conditions imposed by the court and the difficulties caused by the Depression make Jackson's determined and vigorous quest to find his boys extremely difficult.

Cast
 Mark Harmon as Elmer Jackson
 Diana Scarwid as Anna Jackson
 Rosemary Dunsmore as Florence Jackson
 Donnelly Rhodes as Dr. Northfield
 David French as Richard Jackson (age 10)
 Don Jeffcoat as Richard Jackson (age 12)
 Andrew Woodworth as Richard Jackson (age 15)
 Benjamin Turner as Ellis Jackson (age 8)
 Ryan Heavenor as Ellis Jackson (age 10)
 Trey Ames as Ellis Jackson (age 13)
 Chance Michael Corbitt as Wayne Jackson (age 6)
 Ryan Francis as Wayne Jackson (age 8)
 Dick Billingsley as Wayne Jackson (age 11)
 Lance and Gary Verwoerd as Raymond Jackson (age 3)
 Slone Romano as Raymond Jackson (age 5)
 Mark Hildreth as Raymond Jackson (age 8)

Reception
After the Promise received positive reviews from critics. The film was nominated for two Golden Globes. One in the category of "Best Miniseries or Motion Picture Made for Television" and another in the category of "Best Performance by an Actor in a Miniseries or Motion Picture Made for Television" for Mark Harmon. The film was also nominated for two Young Artist Awards in the categories of "Best Family TV Special" and "Best Young Actor/Actress Ensemble in a Television Comedy, Drama Series or Special".

References

External links

After the Promise at TCM

1987 films
1987 drama films
1980s American films
1980s English-language films
American drama television films
American films based on actual events
CBS network films
Drama films based on actual events
Films about father–son relationships
Films about remarriage
Films about widowhood
Films set in the 1930s
Films set in California
Television films based on actual events